From Fear to Eternity may refer to:

 From Fear to Eternity (album), a 2011 compilation album by heavy metal band Iron Maiden
 "From Fear to Eternity" (Charmed), a 1999 episode of Charmed
 "From Fear to Eternity", a 2008 episode of Eureka
 "From Fear to Eternity", a 2013 Monster High TV special